A referendum on legalising casino establishments was held in Palau on 22 June 2011. The proposal was rejected by 75.5% of voters.

Results

References

2011 referendums
Palauan casino referendum, 2011
Palauan casino referendum, 2011
Gambling referendums